Mehdi Daghagheleh (born 30 January 1990 in Khuzestan) is an Iranian football striker who plays for Naft Maysan in Iraqi Premier League.

Club career

Early career
He began his career in Esteghlal Ahvaz, he played three seasons for Esteghlal Ahvaz then moved to Sanat Naft and play two season there.

Malavan
He played three season for Malavan and scored 16 goal. He scored 11 goal for Malavan in the 2013–14 season and Malavan fans selected Daghagheleh as the club's best Malavan player in the 2013–14 Persian Gulf Cup.

Persepolis
He signed a two-year contract with Persepolis on 22 May 2014.

Club career

 Assist Goals

References
 

Iranian footballers
Persian Gulf Pro League players
Esteghlal Ahvaz players
Sanat Naft Abadan F.C. players
Malavan players
Persepolis F.C. players
1990 births
Living people
Footballers at the 2010 Asian Games
Iranian expatriate footballers
Expatriate footballers in Iraq
Iranian expatriates in Iraq
Iranian expatriate sportspeople in Iraq
Association football forwards
Asian Games competitors for Iran
People from Ahvaz
Sportspeople from Khuzestan province